Fogarty is a surname of Irish origin. The name Fogarty in Ireland is derived from the native Irish Ó Fogartaigh Sept who were located in County Tipperary where the name is still very prevalent to this very day.

The barony of Eliogarty that still exists was named after them. This name, with variant spellings (O) Fogerty, Foggarty, Fogaty, Gogarty and Go(g)erty, is an Anglicized form of the old Irish "Ó Fogartaigh". The Irish prefix "Ó" indicates "male descendant of", plus the personal byname "Fogartach" meaning "banished" or "exiled". The Fogartys are of the ancient population group, Dál gCais, otherwise known as the Dalcassians, who inhabited county Clare with adjacent parts of counties Limerick and Tipperary. Eliogarty, the name of a barony in Co. Tipperary, locates the sept, and indicates their importance. The majority of present-day namebearers are found in county Tipperary and Malachy O' Fogarty, of the University of Paris, who flourished in 1700, was born at Castle Fogarty in that county. Another notable namebearer was Archbishop Fogarty (1858 - 1955), who for fifty-one years was Bishop of Killaloe. A Coat of Arms granted to the family depicts two gold lions rampant on a blue shield supporting a gold sheaf of corn, the latter denoting plenty and the Harvest of One's Hopes. The first recorded spelling of the family name is shown to be that of O' Fogarty, King of Ely, County Tipperary, which was dated 1072, "The Annals of Ulster", during the reign of High King of Ireland, "with opposition", 1022 - 1166.

Notable people with the surname include:

Sportspeople
Aidan Fogarty (hurler) (born 1958), Irish former hurler
Alan Fogarty, Irish water polo player
Amby Fogarty (1933–2016), Irish former football player
Bryan Fogarty (1969–2002), Canadian ice hockey player
Carl Fogarty (born 1965), British World Superbike racer
Chris Fogarty (1884–1915), former Australian-rules footballer
Conor Fogarty (born 1990), Irish hurler
Damien Fogarty (born 1985), Irish hurler
Denis Fogarty (born 1983), Irish rugby union player
Jim Fogarty (1864–1891), US baseball player
Joe Fogarty (1885–1954), Australian-rules footballer
John Fogarty (Australian rugby player) (1927–2007), Australian rugby union and rugby league player
John Fogarty (rugby union) 
John Fogarty (disambiguation), several sportspeople
Jon Fogarty (born 1975), American auto racing driver
Ken Fogarty (born 1955), English soccer coach
Lyndsie Fogarty (born 1984), Australian sprint canoeist
Martin Fogarty, Irish hurler
Tom Fogarty (hurler) (born 1952), retired Irish hurling manager
Tom Fogarty, former Australian-rules footballer
Richard Fogarty (Rugby Union player)

Politicians
Andrew Fogarty (1879–1953), Irish politician
Charles J. Fogarty (born 1955), former Lieutenant Governor of Rhode Island
Gerry Fogarty, Canadian politician
John E. Fogarty (1913–67) US Congressman
Kathleen Fogarty, (born 1965), American politician
Patrick Fogarty (died 1947), Irish politician
Ray Fogarty (1957-2018), American politician
William "Bill" Fogarty (1922-2001), Australian politician

Other people
Anne Fogarty (1919–1980), American fashion designer
Brian Fogarty, English novelist, short story writer, poet, painter, and printmaker.
Edward Stephen Fogarty Fegen (1891–1940), Victoria Cross recipient
Francis Fogarty (1899–1973), Air Chief Marshal of the Royal Air Force
Frank Fogarty, cartoonist
James Fogarty (born 1978), British music producer
Joyce Growing Thunder Fogarty (born 1950), Assiniboine-Sioux textile beadworker
Juanita Growing Thunder Fogarty (born 1969), Assiniboine-Sioux textile artist
Kenneth Hubert Fogarty (1923–1989), Mayor of Ottawa (Ontario, Canada) 1970–1972
Lionel Fogarty (born 1958), Indigenous Australian poet and political activist
Mignon Fogarty (born 1967), podcaster and former science writer
Nelson Wellesley Fogarty (1871–1933), first Anglican Bishop of Damaraland (Namibia)
Shelagh Fogarty (born 1966), radio and television presenter and journalist
Thomas J. Fogarty (born 1934), American surgeon
Thomas J. Fogarty (born 1962), American business executive

 John Fogerty (born 1945) American former lead singer/songwriter of the band Creedence Clearwater Revival

See also
 Fogerty
 Éile

References
 

Surnames of Irish origin
Septs of the Dál gCais